The Toyota VD engine is a family of V8 diesel engines produced by Toyota.

1VD-FTV
The 1VD-FTV the only member in the VD engine family. It is a 32-valve DOHC engine, with common rail fuel injection and either one or two variable-geometry turbochargers.

Vehicles and Availability
The single-turbo variant of this engine was first used in Australia commencing 2007, fitted to the 70-series Land Cruiser range. The engine is available in Australia, New Zealand, Pakistan, India, Southern Africa, Central and South America.

The twin-turbo variant saw its first use in September 2007 fitted to the 200-series Land Cruiser wagon, which is available in various worldwide markets. Yanmar also marinized the twin-turbo variant of this engine as 8LV.

Specifications
Designation: 1VD-FTV
Maximum torque: Single turbo Non Intercooled:  @ 1600 rpm; Single turbo:  @ 1200-3200 rpm; Twin turbo:  @ 1600-2600 rpm

References

External links

VD
Diesel engines by model
V8 engines